Esther Kahn is the first English-language film by the French director Arnaud Desplechin. It premiered at the 2000 Cannes Film Festival where it competed for the Palme d'Or, but was not distributed to the United States for two years until it played in New York City in 2002. It stars Summer Phoenix as Esther and Ian Holm as her friend and teacher, Nathan Quellen.

Plot
Esther Kahn a Jewish girl in 19th Century London dreams of becoming a stage actress.

Cast
 Summer Phoenix - Esther Kahn
 Ian Holm - Nathan Quellen
 Fabrice Desplechin - Philippe Haygard
 Akbar Kurtha - Samuel Kahn
 Frances Barber - Rivka Kahn
 László Szabó - Ytzhok Kahn
 Hilary Sesta - Buba
 Claudia Solti - Mina Kahn
 Berna Raif - Becky Kahn
 Emmanuelle Devos - Sylvia (the Italian woman)
 Paul Regan - Joel
 Arnold Brown - Rabbi
 Leon Lissek - Theatre manager
 Ian Bartholomew - Norton
 Samantha Lavelle - Christel
 Kika Markham - Trish
 Paul Ritter - Alman, the photographer

Production
Deplechin adapted the screenplay with regular collaborator Emmanuel Bourdieu from a short story by Arthur Symons of the same name from his book Spiritual Adventures. Summer Phoenix auditioned three times before she was offered the role of Esther.

Reception
Initial reviews of the film were mixed. On the review aggregator website Rotten Tomatoes, the film has an approval rating of 52%, based on 25 reviews. On Metacritic, the film has a weighted average score of 46 out of 100, based on 12 critics.

Cahiers du cinéma named it the best film of 2000. In 2010 it ranked 52nd on Film Comment's end of the decade critics poll.

References

External links

2000 films
2000 drama films
British drama films
English-language French films
2000s French-language films
Films about Jews and Judaism
Films directed by Arnaud Desplechin
Films with screenplays by Arnaud Desplechin
Films set in the 19th century
Films shot in London
French independent films
British independent films
Films scored by Howard Shore
2000s English-language films
2000s British films
2000s French films